Carex hitchcockiana, common name Hitchcock's sedge, is a Carex species that is native to North America. It is listed as endangered in Maryland, as threatened in  New York and Tennessee, and as a species of special concern in Connecticut and Massachusetts.

References

hitchcockiana
Flora of North America